Violent Cop may refer to:

 Violent Cop (1989 film)
 Violent Cop (2000 Steve Cheng film)